Nowsher (also known as Nowshahr) is a village in Nowsher-e Koshk-e Bijar Rural District, Khoshk-e Bijar District, Rasht County, Gilan Province, Iran. At the 2006 census, its population was 833, in 244 families.

References 

Populated places in Rasht County